Li Kan may refer to:

 Li Kan (painter) (李衎), Yuan dynasty painter
 Li Kan (李堪), Eastern Han dynasty warlord who was involved in the Battle of Tong Pass (211)
 Li Kan (李戡, born 1992), son of Li Ao